Oak Valley is an unincorporated community in Elk County, Kansas, United States.  It is located along U.S. Route 160 highway between Longton and Elk City.

History
A post office was opened at Oak Valley in 1875, and remained in operation until it was discontinued in 1954.

Oak Valley was founded in 1879, when a settler built the first residential structure.

References

Further reading

External links
 Elk County maps: Current, Historic, KDOT

Unincorporated communities in Elk County, Kansas
Unincorporated communities in Kansas